Little South Pond is a  reservoir in Plymouth, Massachusetts. The pond is within the Eel River watershed, located west of South Pond village, northwest of Great South Pond, and south of Billington Sea. The pond serves as the primary municipal water supply for the Town of Plymouth.

External links
Environmental Protection Agency
  

Eel River Watershed Improvement Group

Plymouth, Massachusetts
Lakes of Plymouth County, Massachusetts
Reservoirs in Massachusetts
Buildings and structures in Plymouth County, Massachusetts
Protected areas of Plymouth County, Massachusetts